Les Angles is a commune in the Pyrénées-Orientales department in southern France.

Legend has it that at the beginning of the XIV century, the Black Death wiped out the entire population of the former village of Vallsera. Only two sisters survived, they are believed to have donated all of the land to the commune of Les Angles.

Geography

Localisation 
Les Angles is located in the canton of Les Pyrénées catalanes and in the arrondissement of Prades.

Government and politics

Mayors

Population

See also
Communes of the Pyrénées-Orientales department

References
Activities in Les Angles

External links

Official site

Communes of Pyrénées-Orientales